Mario Migliardi (31 May 1919 – 8 August 2000) was an Italian composer of music for movies and television. He was born in Alessandria, Italy.

Works
Migliardi composed music and soundtracks for the following movies and television shows:

A come Andromeda (1972) (mini) TV Series 
 The Price of Death (1971) aka Il Venditore di morte 
Shoot the Living and Pray for the Dead (1971) 
Matalo! (1970) 
Pensiero d'amore (1969) 
Turm der verbotenen Liebe, Der (1968) aka Tower of Screaming Virgins (USA) 
La sfinge sorride prima di morire - Stop Londra (1964)  aka Secret of the Sphinx (USA) 
Chirurgo opera, Il (1964) 
Tharus figlio di Attila (1962) aka Colussus and the Huns (USA: TV title) 
Pianeta degli uomini spenti, Il (1961)  aka Battle of the Worlds (USA: dubbed version)

References
 

1919 births
2000 deaths
Italian male composers
20th-century Italian composers
20th-century Italian male musicians